Sun Communities is a publicly traded real estate investment trust that invests in manufactured housing communities, recreational vehicle communities, and marinas. As of December 31, 2022 the company owned interests in 669 such properties in the United States, Canada and the UK consisting of over 179,700 developed sites and over 47,800 wet slips and dry storage spaces.

Sun Communities is listed on the New York Stock Exchange under the symbol: SUI.

Gary Shiffman serves as chairman and chief executive officer of Sun Communities, Inc., and has been a director and an executive officer since the company's inception in 1993.

Brands
Sun Outdoors (formerly known as Sun RV Resorts) is the RV resort division of Sun Communities, Inc. and was established in 1996. It is the owner and operator of more than 170 resorts and campgrounds across the United States and Canada.

In September 2020, Sun Communities, Inc. closed on the acquisition of Safe Harbors Marinas, as it acquired 99 marinas owned and operated by Safe Harbor.

On April 8, 2022, Sun Communities, Inc. closed on the acquisition of Park Holidays UK as it acquired 40 owned and two managed communities in the United Kingdom.

Sun Unity
Sun Communities, Inc. initiates social responsibility through its Sun Unity Program.

History
The company dates to 1975.

In December 1993, the company became a public company via an initial public offering.

In March 1996, the company acquired 25 manufactured housing communities for $226 million.

In 1996, Sun RV Resorts was established.

In June 2016, the company acquired a portfolio of 103-communities mostly located in California, Florida, and Ontario, Canada for $1.7 billion from an affiliate of Centerbridge Partners.

In October 2019, the company acquired a portfolio of 31 manufactured housing communities for $343.6 million.

In September 2020, the company acquired Safe Harbor Marinas for $2.11 billion.

On Nov. 16, 2021, Sun RV Resorts Rebrands to Sun Outdoors.

In April 2022, the company acquired Park Holidays UK for $1.3 billion.

Gallery

References

External links
 Company Website

1975 establishments in Michigan
1993 initial public offerings
American companies established in 1975
Companies based in Michigan
Companies listed on the New York Stock Exchange
Real estate investment trusts of the United States